Faristenia atrimaculata is a moth in the family Gelechiidae. It is found in Korea.

The wingspan is 14–16 mm. The forewings are greyish orange, partly irrorated with dark brown scales and with a large, trapezoidal costal patch. The hindwings are pale grey.

References

Faristenia
Moths described in 1993